Hoploscopa luteomacula is a moth in the family Crambidae. It is found on Sumatra.

References

Moths described in 1998
Hoploscopini